Sardis Methodist Church is a historic church northeast of Pine Grove off Arkansas Highway 128 in Sparkman, Arkansas.  The single-story wood-frame church was built c. 1895, and is a well-preserved example of a vernacular rural church in Dallas County.  The building features a cross-gable roof, an unusual configuration not seen on most of the county's rural churches, and has a pyramid-roofed tower with open belfry at its southwest corner.

The building was listed on the National Register of Historic Places in 1983.

See also
National Register of Historic Places listings in Dallas County, Arkansas

References

Methodist churches in Arkansas
Churches on the National Register of Historic Places in Arkansas
Churches completed in 1895
Churches in Dallas County, Arkansas
National Register of Historic Places in Dallas County, Arkansas